Susanne Astrup Madsen (born 13 July 1991) is a Danish handball player for HH Elite.

References 
 

Danish female handball players
1991 births
Living people
Sportspeople from Odense